Dehliz (also Romanized as Dehlīz; also known as Dehlīz-e Yek) is a village in Jahad Rural District, Hamidiyeh District, Ahvaz County, Khuzestan Province, Iran. At the 2006 census, its population was 87, in 15 families.

References 

Populated places in Ahvaz County